Amsacta moloneyi is a moth of the family Erebidae. It is found in Africa.

In northern Ghana, it has been reported as a pest of pearl millet crops.

References

Moths described in 1887
Spilosomina
Lepidoptera of West Africa
Moths of Africa
Agricultural pest insects
Insect pests of millets